The Search for Everything is the seventh studio album by American singer-songwriter John Mayer, released on April 14, 2017 by Columbia Records. It is a loose concept album based on the emotions and thoughts of dealing with a break-up: opening with the initial break-up, and closing with the girl getting married.

Promotion

Extended plays
The Search for Everything was preceded by the release of two EPs each featuring four new songs from the album. The album's lead single, "Love on the Weekend", was released on November 17, 2016. The first wave, The Search for Everything: Wave One, released on January 20, 2017. The second wave, The Search for Everything: Wave Two was released on February 24, 2017.

Tour and live performances
On January 30, 2017, John Mayer announced his headlining arena tour, The Search for Everything World Tour, which took place in North America in 2017. On February 24, Mayer announced 30 more tour dates.

On December 6, 2016, Mayer performed the album's lead single "Love on the Weekend" on The Tonight Show Starring Jimmy Fallon. On February 24, Mayer performed "Moving On and Getting Over" on The Ellen DeGeneres Show. On February 28, he performed the single "Still Feel Like Your Man" on Jimmy Kimmel Live!.

Mayer announced in early 2019 that he will be taking The Search for Everything on tour again.  Mayer announced seven Asian tour dates, nine European dates and 32 US dates spanning from March to October 2019.

Critical reception

At Metacritic, which assigns a normalized rating out of 100 to reviews from mainstream critics, The Search for Everything has an average score of 61, which indicates "generally favorable reviews" based on 4 reviews.

Stephen Thomas Erlewine of AllMusic gave it 4.5 out of 5 stars, commenting "Although it's ostensibly a breakup album, The Search for Everything doesn't feel haunted: Mayer glides through the record so smoothly, the supple sound seems almost insouciant. It is also quite alluring. " Jim Farber of Entertainment Weekly called it "the most deeply personal album Mayer has ever released", giving it B+ while stating "if mellowness remains Mayer’s weakness, the brilliance of his best compositions provides a worthy trade-off". Robert Christgau gave this album a two-star honorable mention: "If you wonder why women fall for a guy with his romantic history, listen to his songs with an open mind", highlighting "Love on the Weekend" and "Never on the Day You Leave".

However, Alex McLevy of The A.V. Club gave the album a D, stating "John Mayer loses all trace of anything interesting". The 4.9 out of 10 review from Katherine St. Asaph of Pitchfork was also unfavorable, saying the album is "pleasantly bland".

Commercial performance
The Search for Everything debuted at number two on the US Billboard 200 with 132,000 album-equivalent units, of which 120,000 were pure album sales, becoming Mayer's ninth top 10 album on the chart. It debuted at number one on the US Billboard Top Rock Albums, becoming the third number one album by Mayer in 2017 on this chart following the two EPs Wave One and Wave Two.

Track listing

Personnel

Musicians
Adapted from album's liner notes.

John Mayer – vocals, guitars, piano
Steve Jordan – drums , percussion 
Pino Palladino – bass guitar 
Sheryl Crow – vocals 
Mike Elizondo – bass 
James Fauntleroy – additional keyboards 
Chuck Findley – trumpet 
Larry Goldings – keyboards , pump organ 
Gary Grant – trumpet 
Jerry Hey – horn arrangements and conducting 
Daniel Higgins – saxophone 
Al Jardine – vocals 
Matt Jardine – vocals 
Greg Leisz – lap steel , dobro , pedal steel 
Andy Martin – trombone 
Tiffany Palmer – vocals 
Davide Rossi – strings , string arrangements and conducting 
Aaron Sterling – drums , percussion

Production
Steve Jordan – executive producer
Chad Franscoviak – producer, engineering
John Mayer – producer
Chris Galland – mixing
Manny Marroquin – mixing
Greg Calbi – mastering

Charts

Weekly charts

Year-end charts

Certifications

External links
The Search for Everything at Metacritic

References

2017 albums
John Mayer albums
Columbia Records albums
Sony Music albums
Albums recorded at Capitol Studios
Concept albums